Mary Gernat was a British illustrator, known for her designs for the covers of paperback books by Enid Blyton, Frank Richards and others.

Biography
Gernat was born in Ewell, Surrey, 1926, and underwent training at the Central School of Arts and Crafts and Regent Street Polytechnic.

Much of her work was for Armada Books. She also produced dust jacket designs for some hardback editions, and covers for magazines such as The Tatler.

She married Michael How, an engineer, in 1953. She had four sons, whom she used as models for her designs, and much later a daughter. From 1963 the family lived in Milford on Sea, and in 1970 they moved to Lymington. In later life she developed multiple sclerosis and after ceasing to paint professionally, continued to do so for pleasure. She died in 1998.

In May 2019, 120 of her paintings and sketches were shown on the BBC Television programme Antiques Roadshow by one of her sons, in whose possession they remain.

Book cover designs 

Among the books whose covers were designed by Gernat were:

 A number by Enid Blyton
 Books by Frank Richards in the Billy Bunter series
 Books by Richmal Crompton 'Jimmy' series 
 David Whitaker Doctor Who and the Crusaders - and early Doctor Who spin-off book
 Malcolm Saville: The Sign of the Alpine Rose (1963)
 Books by Monica Edwards
 Sheila K. McCullagh's Griffin Pirate Stories (also known as The Griffin Readers in original editions) that were published by EJ Arnold & Sons Limited for reading in primary/infant schools from the 1950s through to the late 1980s.

References

External links 
 Family photograph of Gernat
 Facebook page about Gerant, run by her son Roger How
 Enid Blyton Society page on Gernat
 World of Blyton blog posts about Gernat

1926 births
1998 deaths
20th-century English painters
20th-century English women artists
Alumni of the Central School of Art and Design
Alumni of the University of Westminster
English illustrators
English women painters
People from Ewell
People from Lymington
People with multiple sclerosis